Anna Ben is an Indian actress who works in Malayalam cinema. The daughter of screenwriter Benny P. Nayarambalam, she made her acting debut with Kumbalangi Nights  in 2019. Anna has since starred in the dramas Helen (2019) and Kappela (2020). For the former, she won the Kerala State Film Award – Special Mention and for the latter, she won the Kerala State Film Award for Best Actress.

Early life
Anna is the daughter of screenwriter Benny P. Nayarambalam and Fulja. She completed schooling from Chinmaya Vidyalaya, Vaduthala. She is a fashion and apparel design graduate from St. Teresa's College, Kochi.

Career
Anna made her feature movie debut in 2019 through commercially and critically successful Kumbalangi Nights in which she played the female lead Baby. She was selected through four rounds of auditions. She described her character as "modern and traditional simultaneously, rooted, with her own point-of-view". The Hindu wrote, "She stood out even in the presence of seasoned performers". The success of that film paved the way for Helen, a survival drama in which she played the titular character of Helen, and Kappela, both appreciated by audience and critics. Director Sathyan Anthikad praised her acting in the former, and Manorama Online reported, "Anna Ben makes Kappela a delightful journey" about the latter. Anna has also appeared in music videos.

Filmography

Films

Awards

References

External links
 
 

Living people
Actresses from Kerala
People from Kochi
Actresses in Malayalam cinema
Indian film actresses
21st-century Indian actresses
St. Teresa's College alumni
1995 births